Meharia philbyi is a moth in the family Cossidae. It is found in Saudi Arabia, Yemen and Oman.

References

Moths described in 1952
Meharia
Invertebrates of the Arabian Peninsula